Thomas James Fordham (born February 20, 1974) is an American former professional baseball pitcher. He played during two seasons at the Major League Baseball for the Chicago White Sox. He was drafted by the White Sox in the 11th round of the 1993 MLB draft. He made his major league debut in 1997. He was called upon once again in 1998. Following a poor performance in 1999, Fordham was signed by the Milwaukee Brewers. He pitched in their Triple-A (Indianapolis Indians) team in 2000 and in 2001.

He missed the 2002 season due to injury.

He split his last season between the Pittsburgh Pirates' Double-A (Altoona Curve) and their Triple-A (Nashville Sounds) teams.

References
"Tom Fordham Statistics". The Baseball Cube. 9 January 2008.
"Tom Fordham Statistics". Baseball-Reference. 9 January 2008.

External links

1974 births
Living people
Altoona Curve players
American expatriate baseball players in Canada
Baseball players from San Diego
Birmingham Barons players
Calgary Cannons players
Charlotte Knights players
Chicago White Sox players
Grossmont Griffins baseball players
Gulf Coast White Sox players
Hickory Crawdads players
Indianapolis Indians players
Major League Baseball pitchers
Nashville Sounds players
Prince William Cannons players
Sarasota White Sox players
South Bend Silver Hawks players